The 2007–08 NBA season was the 62nd season of the National Basketball Association. The Boston Celtics defeated the Los Angeles Lakers 131–92 to win the 2008 NBA Finals, four games to two. The 2007 NBA draft was held on June 28, 2007 and Greg Oden was selected first overall by the Portland Trail Blazers.  However, he missed the entire season due to knee surgery.

This season was notable for being one of the most competitive Western Conference playoff races in NBA history. Up until April 4, 2008, not a single Western Conference team had secured a playoff spot, and the 8th-seeded team was a mere 6.5 games behind the 1st seed. Additionally, the quality of the teams ensured that the Golden State Warriors finished with the highest winning percentage of any non-playoff team in NBA history since the switch to the eight-team playoff format, beating out the 2000–01 Houston Rockets. This was later tied by the 2013–14 Phoenix Suns. The all-time record is held by the 1971–72 Phoenix Suns (49–33), which was during the four-team playoff era.

Notable occurrences

The 2008 NBA All-Star Game was played at the New Orleans Arena, home of the New Orleans Hornets, on February 17, 2008 with the East winning 134–128 and Cleveland's LeBron James being named the MVP. Every single All-Star Game participant would end up in the NBA playoffs, with the exception of Brandon Roy of the Portland Trail Blazers and Dwyane Wade of the Miami Heat.
The Hornets returned to New Orleans, Louisiana full-time, after splitting home games during the previous two seasons with New Orleans and Oklahoma City due to damage caused by Hurricane Katrina.
The NBA extended its eight-year television contract with Time Warner's TNT and The Walt Disney Company's ABC and ESPN through 2016.
Sacramento Kings small forward Ron Artest and Golden State Warriors shooting guard Stephen Jackson were suspended for the first seven games of the season.
The Orlando Magic got approvals in the last week of July for a new arena, which was ready for the 2010–11 season.
After spending 12 seasons with the Minnesota Timberwolves, Kevin Garnett was traded to the Boston Celtics in exchange for seven players, the largest trade in NBA history for one player.
On November 2, 2007, the Seattle SuperSonics made their plans to move to Oklahoma City official.
On December 23, 2007, Kobe Bryant became the youngest player to score 20,000 points at age 29 years, 122 days old, surpassing Wilt Chamberlain's previous record of 29 years, 134 days old.
On December 24, 2007, the Chicago Bulls fired head coach Scott Skiles after a 9–16 start. Jim Boylan was named the interim head coach for the remaining games in the season three days later.
On January 11, 2008, NBA commissioner David Stern granted the Miami Heat a 51.9-second replay on their overtime game on December 19, 2007 versus the Atlanta Hawks because the official scorer ruled incorrectly that Shaquille O'Neal was fouled out, when he was on his fifth foul. The Hawks were fined $50,000 for their "gross negligence". The replay was held on March 8, 2008, before the teams' next meeting. This was the first replay since December 1982 when then-NBA commissioner Larry O'Brien granted a replay on a double overtime game between the San Antonio Spurs and the Los Angeles Lakers. This replay was continued despite O'Neal having been traded to the Phoenix Suns. The Hawks went on to win the replay.
February 2008 was marked by several major trades by some the league's top teams.  Some of the more notable trades include:
Pau Gasol going from the Memphis Grizzlies to the Los Angeles Lakers for Kwame Brown, Javaris Crittenton, Aaron McKie, draft rights to his brother Marc Gasol, and two first-round draft picks in 2008 and 2010.
Shaquille O'Neal going from the Miami Heat to the Phoenix Suns in return for Shawn Marion and Marcus Banks.
Mike Bibby going from the Sacramento Kings to the Atlanta Hawks in exchange for Anthony Johnson, Tyronn Lue, Shelden Williams, Lorenzen Wright, and a second-round 2008 draft pick.
Jason Kidd, along with Malik Allen and Antoine Wright going from the New Jersey Nets to the Dallas Mavericks in exchange for Devin Harris, DeSagana Diop, Maurice Ager, Trenton Hassell, retired Keith Van Horn, two first-round draft picks and three million dollars.
Kurt Thomas going from the Seattle SuperSonics to the San Antonio Spurs in exchange for Brent Barry, Francisco Elson and a 2009 first-round draft pick.  Brent Barry was immediately waived by the Sonics, and later re-signed by the Spurs.
A three-team deal between Cleveland, Chicago, and Seattle that saw Ben Wallace and Joe Smith, a 2009 second-round pick, Sonics forward Wally Szczerbiak and guard Delonte West all go to Cleveland, Cavs forwards Drew Gooden and Cedric Simmons, guards Larry Hughes and Shannon Brown go to Chicago, Cavs forwards Ira Newble and Donyell Marshall, and Bulls forward Adrian Griffin go to Seattle.
Bonzi Wells and Mike James going from the Houston Rockets to the New Orleans Hornets for point guard Bobby Jackson.
On February 28, 2008, Cleveland Cavaliers' LeBron James became the youngest player to score 10,000 points at age 23 years, 59 days old, surpassing Kobe Bryant's previous record of 24 years, 193 days old.
From January 29, 2008 to March 18, 2008, the Houston Rockets won 22 consecutive games, notching the fourth longest winning streak in NBA history.
The Boston Celtics broke the record for the best single-season turnaround in NBA history by improving from 24 wins in 2006–07 to 66 wins this season, a total of 42 games. The previous record of 36 games was held by the 1997–98 San Antonio Spurs, who improved from 20 to 56 wins.
The Atlanta Hawks made the playoffs for the first time since 1999, ending the league's longest playoff drought.
The Golden State Warriors missed the playoffs despite finishing the regular season with a 48–34 record.
On April 28, 2008, Pat Riley announced that he would step down as the Miami Heat head coach after leading the team to a 15–67 record. Former Heat assistant coach Erik Spoelstra was announced as his replacement. Riley remained as team president.
The New Orleans Hornets (now the Pelicans) won their team's first playoff series in franchise history defeating the Dallas Mavericks 4–1. They lost a seven-game series to the San Antonio Spurs in the conference semifinals.
After losing in the first round of the playoffs, Dallas Mavericks coach Avery Johnson was fired as head coach. Former Pacers coach Rick Carlisle was named as Johnson's replacement.
Mike D'Antoni agreed to a four-year, $24 million contract with the New York Knicks. The team D'Antoni left, the Phoenix Suns, replaced him with Terry Porter.
The 2008 NBA Finals featured No. 1 seeds from both conferences for the first time since 2000. The Boston Celtics, who earned their first finals appearance since 1987, faced the Los Angeles Lakers, reviving a classic rivalry not seen since the Lakers beat the Celtics 4–2 in 1987.  This time the Celtics prevailed 4–2 over the Lakers.
Flip Saunders was dismissed as Detroit Pistons head coach, four days after the Celtics beat the Pistons in the Eastern Conference Finals. The Pistons game 4 win over the Celtics marked the last and most recent playoff win as of 2021 for the Motor City as they began to rebuild for the next several years led to longtime Pistons' guard Chauncey Billups was traded to the Denver Nuggets for Allen Iverson after the first few games in the 2008–09 season and sign and traded away several players marked the end of the Pistons era in the mid–2000s.
On June 17, 2008, after a rough 26-game journey, the Boston Celtics won their record 17th NBA Championship with a six-game NBA Finals triumph over the Los Angeles Lakers.
Beginning with this season, all NBA broadcasts on ESPN, ABC and TNT include interviews with the head coaches by the courtside reporter prior to the second and fourth quarter of games. The visiting team's coach is interviewed before the second, the host team's coach is interviewed before the fourth quarter.

Coaching changes

2007–08 NBA changes
Atlanta Hawks – added new logo and new uniforms, replacing red, black, yellow and gold colors with remained red added dark navy blue, grey and silver to their color scheme, added side panels to their jerseys and shorts.
Charlotte Bobcats – added new grey road alternate uniforms added pinstripes with checkered flag of black and white "NASCAR version" side panels to their jerseys and shorts.
Philadelphia 76ers – slightly changed their uniforms added side panels to their jerseys and shorts, added new red road alternate uniforms with blue side panels to their jerseys and shorts.
Washington Wizards – slightly changed their logo and uniforms, replacing dark brown with lighter brown to their color scheme, added side panels to their jerseys and shorts.

Final standings

By division

Eastern Conference
 
 
 

Western Conference

By conference

Notes
z – Clinched home court advantage for the entire playoffs
c – Clinched home court advantage for the conference playoffs
x – Clinched playoff spot
y – Clinched division title

Playoffs
Teams in bold advanced to the next round. The numbers to the left of each team indicate the team's seeding in its conference, and the numbers to the right indicate the number of games the team won in that round. The division champions are marked by an asterisk. Home court advantage does not necessarily belong to the higher-seeded team, but instead the team with the better regular season record; teams enjoying the home advantage are shown in italics.

Statistics leaders

NBA awards

Yearly awards
Most Valuable Player: Kobe Bryant, Los Angeles Lakers
Rookie of the Year: Kevin Durant, Seattle SuperSonics
Defensive Player of the Year: Kevin Garnett, Boston Celtics
Sixth Man of the Year: Manu Ginóbili, San Antonio Spurs
Most Improved Player: Hedo Türkoğlu, Orlando Magic
Coach of the Year: Byron Scott, New Orleans Hornets
Executive of the Year: Danny Ainge, Boston Celtics
Sportsmanship Award: Grant Hill, Phoenix Suns

All-NBA First Team:
F Kevin Garnett – Boston Celtics
F LeBron James – Cleveland Cavaliers
C Dwight Howard – Orlando Magic
G Kobe Bryant – Los Angeles Lakers
G Chris Paul – New Orleans Hornets
NBA All-Defensive First Team:
F Kevin Garnett – Boston Celtics
F Tim Duncan – San Antonio Spurs
C Marcus Camby – Denver Nuggets
G Kobe Bryant – Los Angeles Lakers
G Bruce Bowen – San Antonio Spurs
NBA All-Rookie First Team:
 Al Horford – Atlanta Hawks
 Kevin Durant – Seattle SuperSonics
 Luis Scola – Houston Rockets
 Al Thornton – Los Angeles Clippers
 Jeff Green – Seattle SuperSonics

All-NBA Second Team:
F Tim Duncan – San Antonio Spurs
F Dirk Nowitzki – Dallas Mavericks
C Amar'e Stoudemire – Phoenix Suns
G Steve Nash – Phoenix Suns
G Deron Williams – Utah Jazz
NBA All-Defensive Second Team:
F Tayshaun Prince – Detroit Pistons
F Shane Battier – Houston Rockets
C Dwight Howard – Orlando Magic
G Raja Bell – Phoenix Suns
G Chris Paul – New Orleans Hornets
NBA All-Rookie Second Team:
 Jamario Moon – Toronto Raptors
 Juan Carlos Navarro – Memphis Grizzlies
 Thaddeus Young – Philadelphia 76ers
 Rodney Stuckey – Detroit Pistons
 Carl Landry – Houston Rockets

All-NBA Third Team:
F Carlos Boozer – Utah Jazz
F Paul Pierce – Boston Celtics
C Yao Ming – Houston Rockets
G Tracy McGrady – Houston Rockets
G Manu Ginóbili – San Antonio Spurs

Players of the week
The following players were named the Eastern and Western Conference Players of the Week.

Players of the month
The following players were named the Eastern and Western Conference Players of the Month.

Rookies of the month
The following players were named the Eastern and Western Conference Rookies of the Month.

Coaches of the month
The following coaches were named the Eastern and Western Conference Coaches of the Month.

References

 
NBA
2007–08 in Canadian basketball